Allophanopsis emarginata is a species of beetle in the family Carabidae, the only species in the genus Allophanopsis.

References

Lebiinae